Geronimo Estates is both a census-designated place (CDP) and a populated place in Gila County, Arizona, United States. The population of the CDP was 60 at the 2010 census.

Geography
Via Webber Creek, it is in the watershed of the East Verde River. The populated place of the same name is located nearby, at

Demographics

References

Census-designated places in Gila County, Arizona